Amestoy is a surname. Notable people with the surname include:

Domingo Amestoy (1822–1892), Basque sheepherder and banker
Jeffrey Amestoy (born 1946), American lawyer and politician
Juan Pedro Amestoy (1925–2010), Uruguayan accountant, politician, and ambassador